Arthur John Edward Irvin (10 March 1848 – 22 July 1945) was an English first-class cricketer and clergyman.

The son of The Reverend Joseph Irvin, he was born in March 1848 at Hackness, Yorkshire. He was educated at Rossall School, matriculating at Pembroke College, Oxford in 1867, and graduating B.A. in 1873. While studying at Oxford, he made two appearances in first-class cricket as a wicket-keeper for Oxford University against Southgate in 1868, and the Gentlemen of England in 1871. 

After graduating from Oxford, he took holy orders in the Church of England in 1874. His first ecclesiastical post was as curate of Rothwell, which he held until 1877, before becoming the vicar of Woodlesford in 1877. He served on the Hunslet Rural District council in 1895, in addition to being closely associated with the establishment of a new workhouse at Woodlesford, which would later become St. George's Hospital. Irvin retired to Oxford, before settling at Old Basing, Hampshire. He died there in July 1945, at the age of 97.

References

External links

1848 births
1945 deaths
People from Hackness
People educated at Rossall School
Alumni of Pembroke College, Oxford
English cricketers
Oxford University cricketers
19th-century English Anglican priests
20th-century English Anglican priests
Cricketers from Scarborough, North Yorkshire
People from Old Basing